Anna of Nassau-Dillenburg (21 September 1541 in Dillenburg – 12 February 1616 in Weilburg) was a countesses of the House of Nassau. She married her cousin Albert, Count of Nassau-Weilburg and settled in Schloss Weilburg, where he ruled the district of Weilburg.

Life 
Anna was a daughter of Count William "the Rich" of Nassau-Dillenburg and his second wife, Juliana of Stolberg. She was the seventh child in their marriage, the fourth daughter. The eldest was William I of Orange (1533–1584), known as William the Silent. She had the same name as her aunt Anna of Nassau-Siegen (1440/41–1514), who had died twenty seven years before she was born.

She married Count Albert, Count of Nassau-Weilburg on 16 June 1559 in the Castle of Dillenburg. On that day in Dillenburg two other marriages in the House of Orange took place: Johann VI, Count of Nassau-Dillenburg married Elisabeth of Leuchtenberg, and Elisabeth of Nassau-Dillenburg married Conrad, Count of Solms-Braunfels.

Over the years their house inherited part of the county of Nassau-Weilburg. After his fathers dead in 1561 Albert gained part of territory and his father's debts: Weilburg, Gleiberg, Cleen, labor and Burgschwalbach.

In 1574 he inherited another part of Nassau-Saarbrücken after the death of Count John III. In 1574 a new castle was built in Ottweiler, which became their residence.

Family 
Albert and Anna had the following fourteen children:
 Anna Amalia (1560–1635), married Count Otto of Solms-Sonnewald
 Juliane (1562)
 Catherine (1563–1613), died unmarried
 Louis II, Count of Nassau-Weilburg (1565–1627); inherited Ottweiler
 George Philip (1567–1570)
 Albert (1569–1570)
 William (1570–1597); inherited Weilburg
 Elizabeth (1572–1607), married Count George II of Sayn-Wittgenstein-Berleburg
 Juliane (born: 1574)
 John Casimir (1577–1602), married Elisabeth, a daughter of George I, Landgrave of Hesse-Darmstadt; inherited Gleiberg
 Anna Ottilie (1582–1635), married Count William III of Sayn-Wittgenstein
 Anna Sibylla (born: 1575), married Baron Peter Ernest II of Krichingen-Püttlingen
 Magdalena (1580–1658), died unmarried
 Ernestina (1584–1665), married Louis Philip of Wied

References 

House of Nassau
1541 births
1616 deaths
Countesses of Nassau
16th-century German people
Burials in the Royal Crypt of Weilburg Schlosskirche
Daughters of monarchs